The men's long jump at the 2018 IAAF World Indoor Championships took place on 2 March 2018.

Summary
With only 15 entrants, the event went straight to the final.  On the third jump of the competition, Radek Juška did a 7.99m.  It turned out to be his best of the day.  Only Juan Miguel Echevarría was able to do better in the first round, his 8.19m put him into the lead.  In the second round, Ruswahl Samaai and defending champion Marquis Dendy both jumped 8.02m, with Samaai holding the tiebreaker.  Samaai solidified his position on his third attempt with an 8.05m.  His teammate, reigning outdoor champion Luvo Manyonga was in jeopardy of not getting any more jumps with two fouls.  His 8.33m took him from last to first.  The fourth round got more serious;  Echevarría jumped 8.36m to take back the lead.  Next on the runway, Manyonga bettered that with an African indoor record 8.44m.  In the fifth round, Shi Yuhao's 8.12m pushed Samaai off the podium.  The next jumper Dendy pushed Shi off with an 8.42m, putting himself in silver medal position.  Jarrion Lawson improved to 8.14m on the next jump and two jumpers later, Echevarría hit the winner .  Nobody was able to improve their position in the final round.

In addition to being the 2018 world leader, Echevarría's jump made him the number seven indoor performer of all time.  Manyonga's jump has him tied for number nine on that list, with Mike Powell and Larry Myricks.  Dendy's jump ranks tied for number fifteen.

Results
The final was started at 19:35.

References

Long jump
Long jump at the World Athletics Indoor Championships